The women's individual compound open archery discipline at the 2020 Summer Paralympics was held from 27 to 30 August.

In the ranking rounds each archer shoots 72 arrows, and is seeded according to score. In the knock-out stages each archer shoots three arrows per set against an opponent, the scores being aggregated. Losing semifinalists compete in a bronze medal match. As the field contained 24 archers, the sixteen lowest ranked archers in the ranking round, will play a preliminary match to decide the last of the round 16 places.

Ranking round
The ranking round of the women's individual compound open event was held on 27 August.

Elimination round
The elimination round took place from 29 to 30 August 2021.

Top half

Bottom half

Finals

References

Women's individual compound open